This is a list of television stations in Canada licensed to broadcast by the Canadian Radio-television and Telecommunications Commission (CRTC), all having call signs which begin with the letter C.

A blue background indicates a station that continues to broadcast exclusively via an analogue transmission in lieu of a conversion to digital broadcasting. A dark blue background indicates a station that acts as the flagship of a television network (CBC, Ici Radio-Canada, TVA, CTV, Citytv and Global) or a television system (CTV 2, CBC North and Omni).

See also the list of Canadian television networks.

Other channels
The following is a list of other channels (network cable only channels, former OTA channels, pirate channels) that are Canadian non-specialty channels that do not fall in either categories A, B, or C.

See also 

 Media of Canada
 Television in Canada
 List of television stations in Canada by call sign
 List of Canadian television networks (table)
 List of Canadian television channels
 List of Canadian specialty channels
 Category A services
 Category B services
 Category C services
 List of foreign television channels available in Canada
 List of United States stations available in Canada
 Digital television in Canada
 Multichannel television in Canada
 List of Canadian stations available in the United States
 List of television stations in North America by media market
 List of defunct Canadian television stations

External links 
 Digital Television (DTV) Transition Schedule - April 2017 - Industry Canada
 DTV Post-Transition Allotment Plan - December 2008 - Industry Canada 
 http://www.crtc.gc.ca/eng/archive/2011/2011-379.htm
 http://www.crtc.gc.ca/eng/archive/2011/2011-444.htm
 http://www.crtc.gc.ca/eng/archive/2011/2011-445.htm

 
Canada
 
Television stations